The Mount Washington Auto Road Bicycle Hillclimb is an annual American cycle racing event held in New Hampshire. The event raises money for the Tin Mountain Conservation Center, which promotes appreciation of the environment.

Background
In August of each year, up to six hundred riders take part in the race which centers around a 7.6 mile (12.2 km) climb to the top of New Hampshire's Mount Washington—the highest peak in New England. The Mount Washington Auto Road has an average gradient of 12% and reaches gradients of up to 22%.

The race's most famous victor is Tyler Hamilton who got his fourth victory in the race in 2006 in a time of 52:21, beating out Ned Overend by 2:20. Jeannie Longo holds the women's record at 58:14, while Tom Danielson owns the men's record of 49:24.

In June 2011 race organizers announced that the times ridden by Tyler Hamilton of the United States and Genevieve Jeanson of Canada would no longer be considered official records. This decision followed the admissions by both athletes that during their professional racing careers they regularly used performance-enhancing drugs.

Past winners

See also
 Mount Washington Hillclimb Auto Race
 Mount Washington Road Race

External links
  Official website for Mount Washington Auto Road Bicycle Hillclimb
 Tin Mountain Conservation Center
 Mount Washington Auto Road
 NY Times, Sept 14 1981, pg 49

Recurring sporting events established in 1973
1973 establishments in New Hampshire
Cycle races in the United States
Sports in New Hampshire
Bicycle Hillclimb
Tourist attractions in Coös County, New Hampshire
Road bicycle races